Revelator is the title of a 1993 EP by guitarist Phil Keaggy, released as a "sneak peek" at his next full-length album, Crimson and Blue.

Track listing
All songs were written by Phil Keaggy, unless otherwise noted.

 "Everywhere I Look" (Radio Mix) – 3:09 (Phil Madeira)
 "John the Revelator" (Radio Mix) – 4:58
 "Doin' Nothin'" (Alternate Take - Swamp Version) – 5:48  /  "untitled"  – 1:09
 "John the Revelator" (Extended Strat Mix)  – 8:02  /  "untitled"  – 2:30
 "The Further Adventures of..." (jam with Glass Harp's John Sferra) – 12:46
 "Celebrate" (unedited outro to "Reunion of Friends")  – 2:14

Personnel
Phil Keaggy: guitars, lead vocals
John Sferra: drums
Wade Jaynes: bass
Phil Madeira: Hammond B3, keyboards, background vocals 
Lynn Nichols: guitar, background vocals
Mike Mead: Percussion, background vocals 
Ashley Cleveland: background vocals 
John Mark Painter: Mellotron, trumpet
Jimmy A: background vocals

Production notes
Produced by L. Arthur Nichols
Mixed and engineered by Bill Deaton
Additional engineering by JB
Recorded at the Dugout, Nashville, Tennessee

Phil Keaggy albums
1993 EPs